Remy Gerard Namaduk (born 1949) is a Nauruan politician and former member of the cabinet and member of parliament.

He represented the Anetan Constituency. Namaduk participated in the parliamentary elections in 2003, 2004, 2007, 2008 and in the April elections of 2010, but only the 2003 elections gave him a place in the Parliament of Nauru. He lost his parliamentary mandate to Vassal Gadoengin in 2004.

He held several portfolios in the cabinets of René Harris, including Minister of Education and Minister for Economic Development and Minister for Transport and Telecommunications. He served as Minister Assisting the President of Nauru in all of the cabinets of René Harris between 1999 and 2003. He also served as Minister of Finance several times between 1999 and 2003.

References

1949 births
Living people
Government ministers of Nauru
Members of the Parliament of Nauru
Ministers Assisting the President of Nauru
Finance Ministers of Nauru
20th-century Nauruan politicians
21st-century Nauruan politicians